New York State Route 25 (NY 25) is an east–west state highway in downstate New York in the United States. NY 25 is carried from Manhattan to Queens by way of the double-decked Queensboro Bridge over the East River.

NY 25 is unique among New York State Routes on Long Island, as it is the only one to leave the geographical boundaries of Long Island, albeit minimally; it ends at the western terminus of the Queensboro Bridge. It is also one of only two signed New York State routes in Manhattan (the other is NY 9A.)

NY 25 runs along several differently-named roads. In the borough of Queens, it is called Queens Boulevard, Hillside Avenue and finally Braddock Avenue.  Braddock Avenue ends immediately upon crossing over the Cross Island Parkway. At that point, NY 25 turns east onto Jericho Turnpike, which runs along the Queens-Nassau border from Braddock Avenue to 257th Street. Continuing east through Nassau and western Suffolk counties, NY 25 retains the name Jericho Turnpike. Further east, the highway becomes Main Street in Smithtown, Middle Country Road in central Suffolk, Main Street again in Riverhead, and finally Main Road in eastern Suffolk.

Two alternate routings exist bearing the designation NY 25 Truck, both along the North Fork of Long Island. They began as two separate routes, one between Laurel and Mattituck and the other in the vicinity of Greenport; however, they were effectively merged after a truck route was established between Mattituck and Greenport.

Route description

Manhattan and Queens

NY 25 begins near Second Avenue in Manhattan, at the western end of the double-decked Queensboro Bridge spanning the East River and Roosevelt Island. East of the bridge NY 25 becomes Queens Boulevard at the intersection with NY 25A, in the Long Island City section of the borough of Queens. Queens Plaza is based around this section of the road.

In Long Island City, NY 25 runs southeast beneath the elevated tracks of the IRT Flushing Line. At Thompson Avenue, the route turns to run eastward as the multi-lane divided Queens Boulevard, straddling the Flushing Line's elevated structure eastward to 48th Street, at which point the Flushing Line turns northeast onto Roosevelt Avenue and Queens Boulevard becomes 6 lanes in each direction, with main and service roads. In Woodside, NY 25 meets I-278 at exit 39. In Elmhurst, the road runs over the eponymous subway line starting at the intersection with Grand Boulevard and Broadway. In Corona, the road intersects the Long Island Expressway (I-495) and the northern terminus of Woodhaven Boulevard.

Outside of Rego Park, NY 25 turns slightly southeast towards Forest Hills and Jamaica. In Kew Gardens the route is connected to the westbound and eastbound roadways of Union Turnpike and passes over the Jackie Robinson Parkway without access. Near Jamaica, the road meets I-678 at exit 9, a partial interchange. Three blocks southeast of I-678, NY 25 turns east and is known as Hillside Avenue, a city street that begins at Jamaica Avenue in Richmond Hill near the site of the former LIRR station. This section of NY 25 is undivided but has several lanes in the Jamaica-Hollis area. In Queens Village the route connects with both I-295 and NY 24 at an interchange that serves as NY 24's western end and I-295's southern terminus. East of I-295, NY 25 intersects the western terminus of NY 25B; NY 25 turns southeast onto Braddock Avenue while Hillside Avenue continues east as Route 25B.

In Bellerose, the roadway passes over the Cross Island Parkway and turns east onto Jericho Turnpike. This section, to just before 257th Street, is the border between the Bellerose and Floral Park neighborhoods of Queens to the north and the villages of Bellerose and Floral Park in Nassau County to the south. The westbound lanes are in New York City, whereas the eastbound lanes are in Nassau County.

Nassau and Suffolk counties
NY 25B and Hillside Avenue merge into NY 25 in Mineola. NY 25 continues in this area as a divided highway and parallels the Northern State Parkway. NY 25 again intersects with the Long Island Expressway in Jericho. NY 106 and NY 107 interchange with NY 25 in downtown Jericho, however the exit is not numbered.

The northern end of the Seaford–Oyster Bay Expressway (NY 135) terminates at NY 25 in Syosset. NY 110 intersects at the  mark, in South Huntington. NY 454 begins at an intersection with NY 25 in Commack. Just after the NY 454 intersection, NY 25 meets the Sunken Meadow State Parkway by way of an interchange. NY 25A, a spur of NY 25, becomes concurrent with NY 25 in Smithtown. In Village of the Branch, NY 25A leaves to the north where NY 111 intersects from the south. New York State Bicycle Route 25 (NYS Bike Route 25) also begins along NY 25A at this intersection.

In Coram, NY 25 intersects with NY 112. NY 25A ends at NY 25 in Calverton, and NYS Bike Route 25 joins NY 25 on its way to Orient Point, with occasional diversions in Riverhead, Aquebogue, and Greenport. Four miles (6 km) later, NY 25 encounters the Long Island Expressway one final time at another interchange.  further eastward, in Greenport, NY 25 intersects with NY 114 at its northern terminus. NY 25 continues on the northeastern end of Long Island for the final ten miles (16 km). NY 25 enters Orient and ends at the Orient Point Ferry Landing. An attraction along NY 25 in Orient is Orient Beach State Park.

History

NY 25 was assigned in the mid-1920s along all of what is now NY 25A east of the New York City line and its current alignment from the modern east end of NY 25A to Greenport. At the time, the section of modern NY 25 between the New York City line and Smithtown was state-maintained but unnumbered. It was designated as NY 25A . In the late 1920s, NY 25 was realigned to follow Jericho Turnpike and Middle Country Road between Smithtown and Riverhead while its former alignment to the north became part of NY 25A. In the 1930 renumbering of state highways in New York, the routings of NY 25 and NY 25A were flipped west of Smithtown, placing both routes on their current alignments. NY 25 was extended east to Orient Point .

NY 25 was one of several routes that was extended west into New York City in mid-December 1934 when the city signed routes within its limits for the first time. The route followed Jericho Turnpike, Braddock Avenue, Springfield Boulevard, Horace Harding Boulevard, and several smaller streets (including Corona, Woodside, and Skillman Avenues) westward to Queens Boulevard, then part of NY 24. NY 25 joined NY 24 here, overlapping NY 24 (and NY 25A west of Northern Boulevard) along Queens Boulevard and across the Queensboro Bridge into Manhattan. The three routes continued west for several more blocks along 2nd Avenue and 57th Street to Park Avenue (then NY 22 and NY 100), where NY 24, NY 25, and NY 25A all ended. At the time, the segment of modern NY 25 between Skillman Avenue and 212th Street was part of NY 24.

The overlaps with both NY 24 and NY 25A into Manhattan were eventually eliminated. In the mid-1940s, NY 24 was realigned to enter Manhattan by way of the Queens–Midtown Tunnel. As a result, NY 24 now left NY 25 at what is now exit 36 on the Brooklyn–Queens Expressway. The overlap with NY 25A was removed by 1952 after that route was truncated to the intersection of Northern and Queens Boulevards. NY 25 continued to extend into Manhattan until the mid-1960s when NY 22 was truncated to end in the North Bronx. At that time, westbound traffic on NY 25 continued off the Queensboro Bridge onto 60th Street to Park Avenue, where it turned south, then west along 57th Street to its terminus at the West Side Highway (NY 9A). Eastbound traffic traveled on 57th Street from NY 9A to the Queensboro Bridge entrance ramp. In the mid-1960s, NY 25 was truncated to end in Queens as a result. It was reextended across the Queensboro Bridge on January 1, 1970, to a new terminus at FDR Drive.

New York City and vicinity
NY 25 has been realigned several times within the New York City limits. In the late 1930s, NY 25 was realigned to follow Queens Boulevard (NY 24) from Skillman Avenue to Horace Harding Boulevard, where NY 25 turned eastward to follow Horace Harding Boulevard back to its original alignment at Corona Avenue. The route was altered again in the early 1940s to follow an even more southerly alignment between Horace Harding and Springfield Boulevards via Queens Boulevard and Union Turnpike. NY 25 went unchanged until January 1, 1970, when NY 24 was truncated to begin at the junction of 212th Street and Hillside Avenue. NY 24's former alignment along Queens Boulevard and Hillside Avenue became part of a realigned NY 25, which also used a previously unnumbered segment of Hillside Avenue between 212th Street and Braddock Avenue.

From 1920 to 2005, the section of NY 25 that forms the border between New York City and Nassau County was simultaneously named Jamaica Avenue on the westbound (Queens, New York City) side and Jericho Turnpike on the eastbound (Nassau County) side. Some map makers only showed one of the names. The confusion ended where the road wholly entered Nassau County and thus became Jericho Turnpike in both directions. Similarly, both sides of the road west of Braddock Avenue (where NY 25 splits off to the northwest) were known as Jamaica Avenue even though the south side is still the Nassau County border until 225th Street. Legislation renaming the westbound side of NY 25 between Braddock Avenue and the Nassau County line as Jericho Turnpike was signed into law by New York City Mayor Michael Bloomberg on June 6, 2005, and took effect on September 4.

Former segments
Many former segments of the roads NY 25 follows exist along the current alignment, with most prefaced by the word "Old" in the road name. Within Jericho, Old Jericho Turnpike parallels the current road from a point east of the NY 106–NY 107 interchange and Marian Lane, where the old alignment merges with the current NY 25. Smithtown contains a former segment in the vicinity of the Nissequogue River with a bridge and former right-of-way that still exists today. In Coram, an old alignment of Middle Country Road (NY 25) extends from east of Paul's Path to Grant Smith Road. The road, however, is discontinuous at NY 112. At Middle Island, a former segment of Middle Country Road exists east of Church Lane and north of Bartlett Pond and runs to Robin Drive in Middle Island, where it rejoins NY 25. Another former segment used to dip south to avoid a small lake to the north. A small segment of the road remains intact as Old Middle Country Road from Picaso Way to Woodville Road. Prior to the construction of Picaso Way and the cluster developments it leads to, this section of Old Middle Country Road connected to the existing section at its west end, the stub of which can still be found.

Near Riverhead, Middle Country Road once followed a parallel roadway to the south of the current roadway between River Road and Forge Road. Although some of this section has been dismantled, a portion still exists as modern Forge Road from the Peconic River Bridge to Kroemer Avenue. In Laurel, New York (Southold township), A quarter mile section was rerouted past the town hamlet of Laurel in a more direct and straight manner. The old section became Franklinville Road which connects to NY 25 at both ends of the 1/4 mile bypass. In Mattituck, an old alignment of Main Road (NY 25) exists as Old Main Road from Bray Avenue to west of Sigsbee Road. Southwest of Southold, Main Road originally followed the length of Lower Road and Ackerly Pond Lane between Lower Road and Main Road. To the northeast of the community, another former segment remains intact as Old Main Road between Budd's Pond and Mill Creek to Hashamomuck Pond.

East of Greenport, a former alignment of Main Road is located between the creek from Silver Lake and Silvermere Road. In Orient, two former routings of Main Road exist, both in the vicinity of Bight Road. The first, a loop connecting Grandview Drive to NY 25, is located west of Bight Road. The second, a loop providing access to Whalers Road from NY 25, is west of Charles Rose Airport.

Reconstruction and widening projects
In the early 1970s, the New York State Department of Transportation (NYSDOT) wanted to install frontage roads along a divided NY 25 between Nesconset and Lake Grove as part of a proposed upgrade of NY 347 into a limited-access highway.

In the 1960s and 1970s, NYSDOT wanted to realign both NY 112 and NY 25 in Coram. The realignment and widening of NY 25 was to take place between NY 112 and Winfield Davis Road.

The interchange Between CR 58 and I-495 in Riverhead was completed as a result of I-495's eastern completion. This interchange was fully operational by 1972. It features grade separated ramps, high-speed banked curves, and interstate standard signing. A traffic light at Manor Road was installed at the time of completion of Splish Splash Water Park in 1991.

Suffixed routes
NY 25 once had as many as four suffixed routes; two no longer exist.
 NY 25A is an alternate route of NY 25 across northern Long Island. The route begins at the Queens Midtown Tunnel in Queens and ends at NY 25 in Calverton. It was assigned .
 NY 25B is an alternate route of NY 25 between eastern Queens and Mineola, Nassau County. The route was assigned .
 NY 25C was a connector between NY 25 in the New York City borough of Queens and NY 25B in western Nassau County that utilized Union Turnpike and Marcus Avenue. It was assigned in the mid-1930s and removed in 1970.
 NY 25D was a connector between NY 25 in Queens and NY 25A in Nassau County. The route was assigned  and removed in 1958.

NY 25 Truck

There are two separate routes designated NY 25 Truck on the North Fork of Long Island. The longest of the two routes roughly parallels NY 25 along Franklinville Road, Aldrich Lane, Sound Avenue, and County Route 48 (CR 48) between Laurel and Greenport, while the other follows the north–south Moore's Lane between NY 25 and the east–west truck route just west of Greenport. Together, they bypass a low railroad bridge that carries the Main Line of the Long Island Rail Road over NY 25 in Laurel and narrow historic streets in Greenport.

The two routes were originally distinct highways that did not connect to one another. The truck route along Franklinville Road, Aldrich Lane, and Sound Avenue began as a route between Laurel and Mattituck, which followed Old Sound Avenue at its east end. The other NY 25 Truck began west of Greenport at the junction of NY 25 and Moore's Lane and followed Moore's Lane and CR 48 northeast to NY 25 north of the village. At some point, the section of CR 48 between Mattituck and Greenport was also posted as NY 25 Truck, effectively merging the two routes while retaining the north–south leg of the Greenport truck route along Moore's Lane.

Major intersections

See also

References

External links

 Queensborough Bridge History from NYCROADS.com
 Queens Boulevard Expressway proposals from NYCROADS.com
 Cross Sound Ferry Services
 NY 25 (Greater New York Roads)
 NY Times article about Route 25

025
Streets in Queens, New York
Transportation in Nassau County, New York
Transportation in Suffolk County, New York
Transportation in Manhattan
Roads on Long Island